This is a list of Homeland Learning Centres, which are primary and secondary educational facilities in very remote Indigenous communities in the Northern Territory of Australia. For general information see Homeland Learning Centre.

The information categories are:
 Name: Name of Homeland Learning Centre community. Note that many Indigenous communities have more than one name, each of which may have multiple spellings.
 AC No.: Aboriginal Community Number. BushTel - Remote Communities of the Northern Territory has information on individual remote Northern Territory Aboriginal communities.
 Latitude:
 Longitude:
 Hub School: The school which manages the Homeland Learning Centre.
 Other: Other information.

References

External links
 Northern Territory Government
 NT Department of Education and Training
 BushTel - Remote Communities of the Northern Territory

Aboriginal schools in the Northern Territory
Indigenous Australians in the Northern Territory